Erkinjan Turaxun (born June 1964) is a Chinese politician of Uyghur ethnicity, currently serving as chairman of the Hubei Federation of Trade Unions, vice chairman of the Hubei Provincial Committee of the Chinese People's Political Consultative Conference, and head of United Front Work Department of Hubei Provincial Committee of the Chinese Communist Party. He joined the Chinese Communist Party in January 1985, and entered the workforce in July that same year. 

He was an alternate member of the 18th Central Committee of the Chinese Communist Party, a representative of the 19th National Congress of the Chinese Communist Party, and a member of the 13th National Committee of the Chinese People's Political Consultative Conference.

Early life and education
Erkinjan Turaxun was born in Kashgar Prefecture, Xinjiang, in June 1964. In 1981, he was admitted to Xinjiang University of Finance and Economics, majoring in planning statistics. After graduation, he worked at the Communist Youth League of China of the university.

Career in Xinjiang
In May 1999, he was promoted to become secretary of the Xinjiang Uygur Autonomous Region of the Communist Youth League of China, a position he held until July 2003, when he was transferred to Beijing and appointed secretary of the Secretariat of the Central Committee of the Communist Youth League of China. In May 2008, he was admitted to member of the standing committee of the CPC Xinjiang Uygur Autonomous Regional Committee, the region's top authority. One month later, he was made chairman of the Xinjiang Federation of Trade Unions and vice chairman of All-China Federation of Trade Unions. In January 2015, he was appointed party secretary of Tacheng Prefecture, the top political position in prefecture.

Career in Hubei
In April 2017, Erkinjan Turaxun was transferred to Central China's Hubei province, where he took office as head of United Front Work Department of Hubei Provincial Committee of the Chinese Communist Party, vice chairman of the Hubei Provincial Committee of the Chinese People's Political Consultative Conference, and chairman of Hubei Federation of Trade Unions.

References

1964 births
Living people
People from Kashgar
Uyghur politicians
Xinjiang University of Finance and Economics alumni
Xinjiang University alumni
Central Party School of the Chinese Communist Party alumni
Cheung Kong Graduate School of Business alumni
People's Republic of China politicians from Xinjiang
Chinese Communist Party politicians from Xinjiang
Alternate members of the 18th Central Committee of the Chinese Communist Party
Members of the 13th Chinese People's Political Consultative Conference